Gyanendra Kedarnath Pandey  (born 12 August 1972) is a former Indian cricketer. He is a left-handed batsman and a slow left-arm bowler.

Pandey made his debut in the Pepsi Cup in 1998–99, but he had a much longer association with the game, having played from 1989. He had been playing steadily for Uttar Pradesh's Ranji Trophy team, but only began to make his mark around 1996–97 where two consecutive seasons having scored more than 400 runs brought him into national reckoning.

Pandey retired from first-class cricket in 2006. He was awarded Maati Ratan Samman by Shaheed Shodha Sansthan for his contribution in cricket in 2016.<ref>

References

1972 births
India One Day International cricketers
Indian cricketers
Central Zone cricketers
Uttar Pradesh cricketers
Living people
Cricketers from Lucknow